Priscilla Martins was elected as the "Miss Earth Brazil 2013". The event was held at the Star of the West country club in Divinópolis and with the participation of more than 40 missions across the state in contention for the title of "most beautiful". The event honored the International Year of Water Cooperation. The mission will represent Brazil in the world stage of Miss Earth.

References

Living people
Brazilian beauty pageant winners
Miss Earth 2013 contestants
Year of birth missing (living people)